Mathapoo is a 2013 Indian Tamil-language romantic drama film directed by Nagaraj and starring newcomer Jayan and Gayathrie.

Cast 

Jayan as Karthik 
Gayathrie as Pooja 
Geetha as Pooja's mother
 Sithara as Karthik's aunty
 Ilavarasu as Karthik's uncle
 Renuka as Karthik's mother
 Kitty as Pooja's father
 Pradeep Kottayam as Restaurant worker
 Vivek Rajgopal as Maali
 Senthi Kumari as Maid
 L. Raja as Police inspector

Production 
The film was directed by Nagaraj, who previously directed the film Dhinamdhorum (1998) and wrote the dialogues for Minnale (2001) and Kaakha Kaakha (2003). Jayan, a graduate of DG Vaishnav College, made his acting debut with this film.  Gayathrie of 18 Vayasu and Naduvula Konjam Pakkatha Kaanom fame was signed as the main female actress. Velayudham was signed as the music director of the film. He learned music from Veeraraghavan, M. S. Viswanathan's teacher. Music duo Sabesh–Murali composed the background score for the film. The cast and crew were finalized after eight to nine months. The film was shot in sixty days.

Soundtrack 
The songs were composed by Velayudham. An audio launch was held on 24 April 2013 after being postponed from December 2012. Several celebrities including K. Bhagyaraj, S. P. Jananathan, Balasekaran, Azhagam Perumal, Pandiraj, Suseenthiran, Sasi and Kalanjiyam attended the event.

Release 
The Times of India gave the film two out of five stars and wrote that "What makes this protracted film just that bit bearable are the supporting actors who makes us relate to the characters". Behindwoods gave the film one-and-a-half out of five stars and write that "The excessively slow paced drama also gives a TV ‘mega-serial’ effect every now and then". A critic from Maalaimalar called the film old.

References

External links 

Indian romantic drama films
2013 romantic drama films
2013 films
2010s Tamil-language films